Frigate is the fourteenth studio album by Canadian rock band April Wine, released in 1994.

The album was re-released in 2007. The version of "Tonight Is a Wonderful Time to Fall in Love" featured on the album is a re-recording of the single from the band's 1975 album Stand Back. Frigate also features two cover songs:  Willie Dixon's "I Just Want to Make Love to You", and Steve Winwood's "I'm a Man".

The ship featured on the album cover is Royal Canadian Navy frigate HMCS Antigonish.

Track listing 
All tracks written by Myles Goodwyn unless otherwise noted.
 "Look into the Sun" – 4:50
 "I Just Wanna Make Love to You" (Willie Dixon) – 4:49
 "If I Was a Stranger" (Walter Rathie, Edward Stevens, Tom Rathie) – 4:24
 "Tonite Is a Wonderful Time to Fall in Love" – 4:02
 "Nothin' but a Kiss" – 4:25
 "I'm a Man" (Steve Winwood, Jimmy Miller) – 4:11
 "Whatever It Takes" (Brian Greenway, Myles Goodwyn) – 4:27
 "Drivin' with My Eyes Closed" – 4:23
 "Hard to Believe" – 5:20
 "Keep On Rockin'" – 3:58
 "Mind Over Matter" – 4:41

Personnel 
April Wine
 Myles Goodwyn – lead vocals, guitars, producer
 Brian Greenway – guitars, backing vocals
 Steve Segal – guitars
 Jim Clench – bass, backing vocals
 Jerry Mercer – drums
Additional personnel
 Jean st. Jacques — keyboards
 Walter Rathie — keyboards
 Peter Raivallo — keyboards

References 

April Wine albums
1994 albums
MCA Records albums
Albums produced by Myles Goodwyn